Arthur Robert Peter Baden-Powell, 2nd Baron Baden-Powell,  (known as Peter; 30 October 1913 – 9 December 1962) was the son of Lieutenant-General Robert Baden-Powell, 1st Baron Baden-Powell, the founder of Scouting, and Olave St. Clair Soames.  He served with the British South Africa Police in Southern Rhodesia, and then in the Southern Rhodesian Civil Service until the end of the Second World War, when he returned to Britain, and became a director of companies, and a Special Constable with the City of London Police.

Family life and work
He was born in England, the son of Lieutenant-General Sir Robert Baden-Powell and Olave St. Clair Soames. He attended Charterhouse School, Godalming, Surrey, England, like his father. He entered the Royal Military College, Sandhurst but did not complete the course. He served in the British South Africa Police (BSAP) in Southern Rhodesia from 1934 to 1937. He married Carine Crause Boardman (1913 – 14 May 1993), a nurse from Johannesburg, South Africa, on 3 January 1936. Marriage was forbidden by the BSAP terms of service, so he obtained employment in the Southern Rhodesia Native Affairs Department from 1937 to 1945. He had two sons and a daughter:
 Robert Crause Baden-Powell, born 15 October 1936.
 David Michael Baden-Powell, born December 1940.  
 Wendy Dorothy Baden-Powell, born 16 September 1944, unmarried, and lives in Melbourne, Australia.
After he inherited the peerage, he returned to Britain in 1945 for eighteen months and then permanently in 1949 and became a company director and a special constable with the City of London Police.

He died on 9 December 1962, aged 49 in St. Thomas's Hospital, London after, already suffering Leukaemia, he spent a night in his parents' 1929 caravan in wet and cold conditions at a Gilwell re-union in September 1962 and caught a cold that turned to pneumonia then pleurisy and he suffered a heart attack.

Later career
He was named Arthur after his mother's brother, Robert after his father, and Peter after the eponymous character of the play Peter Pan by James Barrie, of whom his father was a fan (likewise, he named his daughter Wendy after another character in the play).

He was:
 1948 - elected a member of the Mercers' Company.
 a Fellow of the Royal Society of Arts (R.S.A.).
 involved in Scouting.
 Guildmaster of The B–P Guild of Old Scouts, until his death.

In May 1952 he visited Poole, Dorset and opened the new hall of the 1st Hamworthy Scouts' who had had been started by some boys from his father's 1907 Brownsea Island experimental camp. He played his father in a pageant on the history of Scouting at the 50th Anniversary World Scout Jamboree at Sutton Coldfield in 1957. He was awarded:
 1957 - Austrian Scouting's  
 1957 - Scout Association of Japan's Golden Pheasant Award.

Arms

Ancestry

References

1913 births
1963 deaths
Barons Baden-Powell
People educated at Charterhouse School
People from Ewhurst, East Sussex
People associated with Scouting
British South Africa Police officers
Peter
British special constables